Angela Krislinzki is an Indo-Polish actress and model who primarily acts in Telugu and Hindi films. Her Telugu debut movie was Rogue directed by Puri Jagannadh. She is also known as Annie Krislinzki. The few reality shows that she was seen in are Beauty and the Geek, Splitsvilla, Lux the chosen one and she was last seen on a reality show on star plus's India's Next Superstars, judged by Karan Johar and Rohit Shetty. Her Bollywood debut was 1921, directed by Vikram Bhatt. Apart from acting, she is trained in different dance forms, and has done various special dance numbers in south Indian movies like Jyothi Lakshmi and Size Zero.

Filmography

Music Videos

References

External links

 
 Angela on Filmibeat
 Angela on Times of India

Living people
Actresses from Mumbai
Female models from Mumbai
Indian people of Polish descent
Polish film actresses
Polish female models
Actresses in Hindi cinema
Actresses in Telugu cinema
Actresses in Tamil cinema
Actresses in Kannada cinema
Polish expatriates in India
European actresses in India
Actresses of European descent in Indian films
Year of birth missing (living people)
21st-century Polish actresses